"You All Goodnight" is a song by George Jones. Jones wrote the song with Marge Broadway and it was released as his third single on Starday Records, released on September 25, 1954.

Recording and background
During Jones' third session, Jones recorded "You All Goodnight" in the living room of Bill Quinn (associate of producer Pappy Daily). Much like Jones' early work, the song was influenced heavily by Jones' favorite idol, Hank Williams. It was Jones' 7th overall recording since his first on January 19.

The b-side included one Jones' previously released song, "Let Him Know."

Recorded in the living room of Quinn at 5628 Brock Street in Houston, the recording facility was primitive. Former Starday president Don Pierce recalls to Allen, "The place was held together with chewing gum. There was egg cartons on the wall, just one microphone that hung down from the wooden ceiling beams...The control room was just another room in the house, and Bill couldn't see the musicians from there...everything was pretty much done in one take."

Personnel
George Jones (vocal, acoustic)
Jimmy Biggar (steel)
Bob Heppler (bass)
Red Hayes (fiddle)
Milburn "Burney" Annett (piano)

References

1954 songs
George Jones songs
Songs written by George Jones
Starday Records singles